Mohammad Sekander Hossain Miah is a Jatiya Party (Ershad) politician and the former Member of Parliament of Chittagong-9.

Career
Mohammad Sekander Hossain Miah was elected to parliament from Chittagong-9 as a Jatiya Party candidate in 1986 and 1988.

References

Jatiya Party politicians
Living people
3rd Jatiya Sangsad members
4th Jatiya Sangsad members
People from Chittagong District
Year of birth missing (living people)